Kaasa is a Norwegian surname. Notable people with the surname include:

Kjell Roar Kaasa (born 1966), Norwegian footballer
Markus André Kaasa (born 1997), Norwegian footballer

See also
Kannula Kaasa Kattappa (English: Show me the money), a 2016 Indian Tamil-language drama film

References

Norwegian-language surnames